There are 66 cities and towns in Moldova.

Alphabetical list

A
Anenii Noi

B
Basarabeasca
Bălți
Biruința
Briceni
Bucovăț
Borceag

C
Cahul
Camenca
Cantemir
Căinari
Călărași
Căușeni
Ceadîr-Lunga
Chișinău
Cimișlia

Codru
Comrat
Cornești
Costești
Crasnoe
Cricova
Criuleni
Cupcini

D
Dnestrovsc
Dondușeni
Drochia
Dubăsari
Durlești

E
Edineț

F
Fălești

Florești
Frunză

G
Ghindești
Glodeni
Grigoriopol

H
Hîncești

I
Ialoveni
Iargara

L
Leova
Lipcani

M
Maiac

Mărculești

N
Nisporeni

O
Ocnița
Orhei
Otaci

R
Rezina
Rîbnița
Rîșcani

S
Sîngera
Sîngerei
Slobozia
Soroca
Strășeni

Ș
Șoldănești
Ștefan Vodă

T
Taraclia
Telenești
Tighina (Bender)
Tiraspol
Tiraspolul Nou
Tvardița

U
Ungheni

V
Vadul lui Vodă
Vatra
Vulcănești

By status
There are 13 localities with municipiu status: Bălți, Cahul, Ceadîr-Lunga, Chișinău, Comrat, Edineț, Hîncești, Orhei, Soroca, Strășeni, Ungheni, Bender (Tighina), and Tiraspol. The other 53 have city status.

By location
For the distribution of cities and towns by district, see List of localities in Moldova.

By population

References
2004 Moldovan Census
2004 Census in Transnistria
citypopulation.de

Moldova, List of cities in
 
 
Cities